Quinsac is the name of several communes in France:

 Quinsac, Dordogne, in the Dordogne department
 Quinsac, Gironde, in the Gironde department